Vokesimurex multiplicatus is a species of sea snail, a marine gastropod mollusk in the family Muricidae, the murex snails or rock snails.

There are two subspecies:
 Vokesimurex multiplicatus bantamensis (Martin, 1895) (synonyms: Murex (Haustellum) bantamensis (Martin, 1895); Murex (Haustellum) bantamensis var. oostinghi Wissema, 1947; Murex bantamensis Martin, 1895)
 Vokesimurex multiplicatus multiplicatus (G.B. Sowerby III, 1895): common name: multiplicate snipe's bill, (synonym: † Murex embryoliratus P.J. Fischer, 1927 )

Description
The size of the shell varies between 30 mm and 80 mm.

Distribution
This marine species occurs mainly off Australia (Northern Territory, Queensland, Western Australia), but has also been found off Papua New Guinea, the Moluccas and Java.

References

 Sowerby, G.B. (3rd) 1895. Descriptions of nine new species of shells. Proceedings of the Malacological Society of London 1(5): 214–217
 Brazier, J. 1877. List of marine shells, with descriptions of the new species collected during the 'Chevert' Expedition. Proceedings of the Linnean Society of New South Wales 1(3): 169–181
 Ponder, W.F. & Vokes, E.H. 1988. A revision of the Indo-West Pacific fossil and recent species of Murex s.s. and Haustellum (Mollusca: Gastropoda: Muricidae). Records of the Australian Museum 8: 1–160 
 Merle D., Garrigues B. & Pointier J.-P. (2011) Fossil and Recent Muricidae of the world. Part Muricinae. Hackenheim: Conchbooks. 648 pp

External links
 Ponder W.F. & Vokes E.H. (1988) A revision of the Indo-West Pacific fossil and Recent species of Murex s.s. and Haustellum (Mollusca: Gastropoda: Muricidae). Records of the Australian Museum suppl.8: 1–160
 

Gastropods described in 1895
Vokesimurex